Evarcha arcuata is a species of jumping spiders with a palearctic distribution.

Description

Males reach a body length of about six, females up to eight millimetres. The female has a brown and whitish cephalothorax, and an opisthosoma with a distinct pattern of black diagonal spots, sometimes with a white outline.
The male is in contrast almost black with a copper-like gloss. His face features a horizontal pattern of black and white stripes. While males are found very frequently, females often hide in their retreats, for example between rolled leaves. During early winter she guards her egg sac here.

Name
The species name is possibly derived from Latin arcus "bow", with the meaning "arched", referring to the arched abdomen.

References

External links

Salticidae
Palearctic spiders
Spiders of Europe
Spiders described in 1757
Taxa named by Carl Alexander Clerck
Articles containing video clips